Spinocerebellar ataxia (SCA) is a progressive, degenerative, genetic disease with multiple types, each of which could be considered a neurological condition in its own right. An estimated 150,000 people in the United States have a diagnosis of spinocerebellar ataxia at any given time. SCA is hereditary, progressive, degenerative, and often fatal. There is no known effective treatment or cure. SCA can affect anyone of any age. The disease is caused by either a recessive or dominant gene. In many cases people are not aware that they carry a relevant gene until they have children who begin to show signs of having the disorder.

Signs and symptoms
Spinocerebellar ataxia (SCA) is one of a group of genetic disorders characterized by slowly progressive incoordination of gait and is often associated with poor coordination of hands, speech, and eye movements. A review of different clinical features among SCA subtypes was recently published describing the frequency of non-cerebellar features, like parkinsonism, chorea, pyramidalism, cognitive impairment, peripheral neuropathy, seizures, among others. As with other forms of ataxia, SCA frequently results in atrophy of the cerebellum, loss of fine coordination of muscle movements leading to unsteady and clumsy motion, and other symptoms. Ocular deficits can be quantified using the SODA scale.

The symptoms of an ataxia vary with the specific type and with the individual patient. In many cases a person with ataxia retains full mental capacity but progressively loses physical control.

Cause
The hereditary ataxias are categorized by mode of inheritance and causative gene or chromosomal locus. The hereditary ataxias can be inherited in an autosomal dominant, autosomal recessive, or X-linked manner.
 Many types of autosomal dominant cerebellar ataxias for which specific genetic information is available are now known. Synonyms for autosomal-dominant cerebellar ataxias (ADCA) used prior to the current understanding of the molecular genetics were Marie's ataxia, inherited olivopontocerebellar atrophy, cerebello-olivary atrophy, or the more generic term "spinocerebellar degeneration." (Spinocerebellar degeneration is a rare inherited neurological disorder of the central nervous system characterized by the slow degeneration of certain areas of the brain. There are three forms of spinocerebellar degeneration: Types 1, 2, 3. Symptoms begin during adulthood.)
 There are five typical autosomal-recessive disorders in which ataxia is a prominent feature: Friedreich ataxia, ataxia-telangiectasia, ataxia with vitamin E deficiency, ataxia with oculomotor apraxia (AOA), spastic ataxia. Disorder subdivisions: Friedreich's ataxia, Spinocerebellar ataxia, Ataxia telangiectasia, Vasomotor ataxia, Vestibulocerebellar, Ataxiadynamia, Ataxiophemia, and Olivopontocerebellar atrophy.
 There have been reported cases where a polyglutamine expansion may lengthen when passed down, which often can result in an earlier age-of-onset and a more severe disease phenotype for individuals who inherit the disease allele.  This falls under the category of genetic anticipation. Several types of SCA are characterized by repeat expansion of the trinucleotide sequence CAG in DNA that encodes a polyglutamine repeat tract in protein.  The expansion of CAG repeats over successive generations appears to be due to slipped strand mispairing during DNA replication or DNA repair.

Diagnosis

Classification
A few SCAs remain unspecified and can not be precisely diagnosed, but in the last decade genetic testing has allowed precise identification of dozens of different SCAs  and more tests are being added each year. In 2008, a genetic ataxia blood test developed to test for 12 types of SCA, Friedreich's ataxia, and several others.  However, since not every SCA has been genetically identified some SCAs are still diagnosed  by neurological examination, which  may include a physical exam, family history, MRI scanning of the brain and spine, and spinal tap.

Many SCAs below fall under the category of polyglutamine diseases, which are caused when a disease-associated protein (i.e., ataxin-1, ataxin-3, etc.) contains a large number of repeats of glutamine residues, termed a polyQ sequence or a "CAG trinucleotide repeat" disease for either the one-letter designation or codon for glutamine respectively. The threshold for symptoms in most forms of SCA is around 35, though for SCA3 it extends beyond 50. Most polyglutamine diseases are dominant due to the interactions of resulting polyQ tail.

The first ataxia gene was identified in 1993 and called "Spinocerebellar ataxia type 1" (SCA1); later genes were called SCA2, SCA3, etc. Usually, the "type" number of "SCA" refers to the order in which the gene was found. At this time, there are at least 29 different gene mutations that have been found.

The following is a list of some of the many types of Spinocerebellar ataxia.

Others include SCA18, SCA20, SCA21, SCA23, SCA26, SCA28, and SCA29.

Four X-linked types have been described, but only the first of these has so far been tied to a gene (SCAX1).'''

Treatment

Medication 
There is no cure for spinocerebellar ataxia, which is currently considered to be a progressive and irreversible disease, although not all types cause equally severe disability.

In general, treatments are directed towards alleviating symptoms, not the disease itself. Many patients with hereditary or idiopathic forms of ataxia have other symptoms in addition to ataxia. Medications or other therapies might be appropriate for some of these symptoms, which could include tremor, stiffness, depression, spasticity, and sleep disorders, among others. Both onset of initial symptoms and duration of disease are variable. If the disease is caused by a polyglutamine trinucleotide repeat CAG expansion, a longer expansion may lead to an earlier onset and a more radical progression of clinical symptoms. Typically, a person with this disease will eventually be unable to perform daily tasks (ADLs). However, rehabilitation therapists can help patients to maximize their ability of self-care and delay deterioration to certain extent. Researchers are exploring multiple avenues for a cure including RNAi and the use of Stem Cells and several other avenues.

On January 18, 2017, BioBlast Pharma announced completion of Phase 2a clinical trials of their medication, Trehalose, in the treatment of SCA3.  BioBlast has received FDA Fast Track status and Orphan Drug status for their treatment.  The information provided by BioBlast in their research indicates that they hope this treatment may prove efficacious in other SCA treatments that have similar pathology related to PolyA and PolyQ diseases.

In addition, Dr. Beverly Davidson has been working on a methodology using RNAi technology to find a potential cure for over 2 decades.  Her research began in the mid-1990s and progressed to work with mouse models about a decade later and most recently has moved to a study with non-human primates.  The results from her most recent research "are supportive of clinical application of this gene therapy".

Finally, another gene transfer technology discovered in 2011 has also been shown by Boudreau et al. to hold great promise and offers yet another avenue to a potential future cure.

N-Acetyl-Leucine 
N-Acetyl-Leucine is an orally administered, modified amino acid that is being developed as a novel treatment for multiple rare and common neurological disorders by IntraBio Inc (Oxford, United Kingdom).

N-Acetyl-Leucine has been granted multiple orphan drug designations from the U.S. Food & Drug Administration (FDA) and the European Medicines Agency (EMA) for the treatment of various genetic diseases, including Spinocerebellar Ataxias. N-Acetyl-Leucine has also been granted Orphan Drug Designations in the US and EU for the related inherited cerebellar ataxia Ataxia-Telangiectasia U.S. Food & Drug Administration (FDA) and the European Medicines Agency (EMA).

Published case series studies have demonstrated the effects of acute treatment with N-Acetyl-Leucine for the treatment of inherited cerebellar ataxias, including Spinocerebellar Ataxias. These studies further demonstrated that the treatment is well tolerated, with a good safety profile.
A multinational clinical trial investigating N-Acetyl-L-Leucine for the treatment of a related inherited cerebellar ataxia, Ataxia-Telangiectasia, began in 2019.

IntraBio is also conducting parallel clinical trials with N-Acetyl-L-Leucine for the treatment of Niemann-Pick disease type C and GM2 Gangliosidosis (Tay-Sachs and Sandhoff Disease). Future opportunities to develop N-Acetyl-Leucine include Lewy Body Dementia, Amyotrophic lateral sclerosis, Restless Leg Syndrome, Multiple Sclerosis, and Migraine.

Rehabilitation

Physical therapists can assist patients in maintaining their level of independence through therapeutic exercise programmes.  One recent research report demonstrated a gain of 2 SARA points (Scale for the Assessment and Rating of Ataxia) from physical therapy. In general, physical therapy emphasises postural balance and gait training for ataxia patients. General conditioning such as range-of-motion exercises and muscle strengthening would also be included in therapeutic exercise programmes.  Research showed that spinocerebellar ataxia 2 (SCA2) patients with a mild stage of the disease gained significant improvement in static balance and neurological indices after six months of a physical therapy exercise training program. Occupational therapists may assist patients with incoordination or ataxia issues through the use of adaptive devices. Such devices may include a cane, crutches, walker, or wheelchair for those with impaired gait. Other devices are available to assist with writing, feeding, and self care if hand and arm coordination are impaired. A randomised clinical trial revealed that an intensive rehabilitation program with physical and occupational therapies for patients with degenerative cerebellar diseases can significantly improve functional gains in ataxia, gait, and activities of daily living. Some level of improvement was shown to be maintained 24 weeks post-treatment. Speech language pathologists may use both behavioral intervention strategies as well as augmentative and alternative communication devices to help patients with impaired speech.

References

Further reading

  In 
  In 
  In 
  In

External links 
 
 
 
 
 
 

Autosomal dominant disorders
Systemic atrophies primarily affecting the central nervous system
Neurodegenerative disorders
Cytoskeletal defects
Rare diseases